Mebrdzoli Ateisti (translation of the name: "Militant Atheist") was an anti-religious magazine in the Georgian language. It was the publication of the Central Soviet of the League of Militant Atheists of the Georgian Soviet Socialist Republic. The magazine was published in Tbilisi. In 1932, the newspaper Mebrdzoli Ughmerto (translation of the name: "Militant Godless") began to be published in Tiflis. It left the printing house several. Since 21 issues of 1934 the newspaper changed its name to Mebrdzoli Ateisti and began to be published in the form of a magazine. The editor of the magazine was Sylvester Yasevich Todria. The latest issue of this magazine was published in May 1941. The circulation of the magazine was 6,000 copies. The magazine published materials on the essence of religion, its social and epistemological roots, highlighted certain aspects of the history of religion, examined forms and methods of anti-religious propaganda. In addition to this magazine, other anti-religious periodicals in the Georgian language were also published, in 1933-1934 the newspaper «Sakartvelos Ugmerto» (translation of the name: «The Godless of Georgia») was published, and then the magazine «Religiis Tsinaagmdeg» (translation of the name: «Against Religion»)

References

Notes

 მებრძოლი უღმერთო  ტფილისი, 1932-1934
 მებრძოლი ათეისტი  ტფილისი, 1934-1941

1932 establishments in the Soviet Union
1941 disestablishments in the Soviet Union
Anti-religious campaign in the Soviet Union
Anti-Christian sentiment in Europe
Anti-Christian sentiment in Asia
Atheism publications
Magazines established in 1932
Magazines disestablished in 1941
Mass media in Tbilisi
Persecution of Muslims
Propaganda in the Soviet Union
Propaganda newspapers and magazines
Religious persecution by communists
Magazines published in the Soviet Union
Anti-Islam sentiment in the Soviet Union